Marcus Baldwin (born 24 October 1979) is a former Australian rules footballer  for the Geelong Football Club in the Australian Football League (AFL), playing five games between 2000 and 2001.

External links
 

1979 births
Living people
Geelong Football Club players
Calder Cannons players
Australian rules footballers from Victoria (Australia)